Catherine of Castile (Castilian: Catalina de Castilla; 5 October 1422 - 17 September 1424) was suo jure Princess of Asturias and heiress presumptive to the Castilian throne all her life.

Catherine was born on 5 October 1422 in Illescas, Toledo. She was the first child of King John II of Castile and his first wife, Maria of Aragon. Named after her aunt and grandmother, the Duchess of Villena and Catherine of Lancaster, she immediately became heiress presumptive to the throne of Castile upon her birth. The Infanta was formally recognised as successor to the throne of the kingdom and sworn in as Princess of Asturias on 1 January 1423 by the Cortes of Toledo.

However, the Princess of Asturias did not live long enough to succeed her father as Queen of Castile. She died in Madrigal de las Altas Torres on 17 September 1424. Her younger sister, Infanta Eleanor, replaced her as heiress and Princess of Asturias. Princess Catherine is buried in Miraflores Charterhouse, along with her father and stepmother, Isabella of Portugal. She succeeded her father, John II of Castile, as Princess of Asturias in 1422.

Ancestry

References 

1422 births
1424 deaths
15th-century Castilians
15th-century Spanish women
Castilian infantas
House of Trastámara
Princes of Asturias
Burials at Miraflores Charterhouse
People from Toledo, Spain
Spanish Roman Catholics
Spanish people of Italian descent
Spanish people of Portuguese descent
Spanish people of English descent
Spanish people of French descent
Daughters of kings
Royalty and nobility who died as children
Non-inheriting heirs presumptive